Ministry of the Electronics Industry may refer to:

 Ministry of the Electronics Industry (China)
 Ministry of the Electronics Industry (Soviet Union)